Leptopteris moorei  is a fern in the family Osmundaceae. The specific epithet honours Charles Moore, Director of the Royal Botanic Gardens in Sydney from 1849 to 1896, who collected plants on Lord Howe Island in 1869.

Description
The fern has a 20–30 cm high trunk. Its 2- or 3-pinnatifid fronds are 0.5–1 m long and 30–45 cm wide.

Distribution and habitat
The fern is endemic to Australia’s subtropical Lord Howe Island in the Tasman Sea; it only occurs on the summit of Mount Gower at the southern end of the island.

References

Osmundales
Endemic flora of Lord Howe Island
Plants described in 1873
Ferns of Australia
Taxa named by John Gilbert Baker
Taxa named by Konrad H. Christ